The 2019 FIBA Europe SuperCup Women was the 9th edition of the FIBA Europe SuperCup Women. It was held on 10 October 2019 at the DIVS Sport Hall in Yekaterinburg, Russia.

Final

References

External links
 SuperCup Women

2019
2019–20 in European women's basketball
2019–20 in Russian basketball
International women's basketball competitions hosted by Russia
Sport in Yekaterinburg
October 2019 sports events in Russia